Cedar Ridge is a historic home located East of Disputanta, in Surry County, Virginia.  The original one-room section was built about 1750, and later enlarged to a -story, three bay, single pile, Colonial frame dwelling. The main house has a later rear addition of an enclosed breezeway connecting to a two-story kitchen and bedchamber addition. The footprint of the house resembles a modified "T" shape. The house was restored, and the chimneys rebuilt, in the late-1970s.  Also on the property is a one-story outbuilding that may once have served as slaves' quarters.

It was listed on the National Register of Historic Places in 2000.

References

Houses on the National Register of Historic Places in Virginia
Colonial architecture in Virginia
Houses completed in 1750
National Register of Historic Places in Surry County, Virginia
Houses in Surry County, Virginia